Zhu Dianfa (born 30 September 1964) is a Chinese cross-country skier. He competed in the men's 15 kilometre event at the 1984 Winter Olympics.

References

1964 births
Living people
Chinese male cross-country skiers
Olympic cross-country skiers of China
Cross-country skiers at the 1984 Winter Olympics
Place of birth missing (living people)
Asian Games medalists in cross-country skiing
Cross-country skiers at the 1986 Asian Winter Games
Asian Games bronze medalists for China
Medalists at the 1986 Asian Winter Games